"The Novocaine Mutiny" is an episode from the TV series M*A*S*H, the twentieth episode of its fourth season. It was aired on January 27, 1976, was written by Burt Prelutsky and directed by Harry Morgan. As Prelutsky had written a number of episodes of Dragnet, of which Morgan had been a main cast member, the episode could be said to be a reunion, of sorts, between the two men.

Synopsis 
Frank Burns has filed charges of mutiny against Hawkeye Pierce for an incident that happened during a busy surgical shift in the operating room. A preliminary hearing is convened to determine whether Hawkeye should face a court-martial, which could lead to his execution if he is found guilty. B. J. Hunnicutt is called as the first witness and begins to recount the events that led to the alleged mutiny.

As soon as Colonel Potter departed for Tokyo for a week, Frank assumed temporary command and immediately began to implement his gung-ho vision for the camp, including a ban on gambling. When he learned that Staff Sergeant Zale had lost $300, he instituted a camp-wide search for the money, ignoring repeated insistences that Zale had lost it in a poker game.

Radar is called as the next witness and testifies to Frank's intrusive search methods, ending at Radar's own bunk in the camp office. Frank never found the money because Radar had hidden it in his teddy bear. The presiding officer, Lt. Colonel Carmichael, now calls Frank to describe the mutiny itself. Frank embellishes his account to cast himself in a heroic light - performing multiple difficult surgeries, bolstering everyone's spirits, and even taking over for an exhausted Father Mulcahy to administer last rites for a patient. He claims that an overworked Hawkeye drugged him into unconsciousness and took command of the unit.

Hawkeye disputes the entire story, stating that Frank had been sending patients into the OR at risk of death during surgery, instead of doing the proper pre-op workup on them. Frank accused Hawkeye and B.J. of nitpicking and complained that the surgical staff would have no chance of keeping up with the influx of wounded. When Hawkeye half-jokingly threatened Frank with physical violence, Frank backed away and was hit in the face and knocked out by an opening door. Hawkeye sent Mulcahy to work in pre-op and had Corporal Klinger drag Frank out of the OR.

Carmichael decides that the evidence does not warrant a court-martial and dismisses the proceedings, expressing his derisive opinion that Frank might have been made a pastry chef if he had not been drafted as a doctor. Afterward, back at camp, Hawkeye and B. J. start a new poker game and Potter joins in, ignoring Frank's un-rescinded order against gambling.

M*A*S*H (season 4) episodes
1976 American television episodes
Courts-martial in fiction